Michael Lounsbury (born 1966) is an American organizational theorist, Associate Dean of Research, Thornton A. Graham Chair and Professor of strategic management, organizations and sociology at the University of Alberta, and expert in innovation and institutions.

Biography 
Lounsbury received his Ph.D. from Northwestern University in 1999.  Previously, he was a J. Thomas Clark Professor of Entrepreneurship and Personal Enterprise at Cornell University.

Currently he is a Professor of strategic management, organizations and sociology at the University of Alberta, where he is the director of the Technology Commercialization Centre.  He also is a Research Officer at the Canadian National Institute for Nanotechnology.

He is editor-in-chief of Research in the Sociology of Organizations published by Emerald Group Publishing, co-editor of Organization Studies published by SAGE Publications, and Associate Editor of Academy of Management Annals. Formerly, he was editor-in-chief of Journal of Management Inquiry published by SAGE Publications.

In 2010, Lounsbury was awarded the Martha Cook Piper Research Prize at the University of Alberta.  In 2006, he received the Western Academy of Management's Ascendant Scholar Award as well as the Petro-Canada Young Innovator award. He was also the winner of James Thompson Award from the American Sociological Association in 1996.

Work 
His research has contributed to the new institutionalism by focusing on entrepreneurial dynamics and the emergence of new industries and practices.  He has published research on social movement activism in the building of a recycling industry, money manager professionalization in the mutual fund industry, and the co-evolution of nanoscience and nanotechnology.

His book, The Institutional Logics Perspective (coauthored with Patricia Thornton and William Ocasio), was the 2013 co-winner of the Academy of Management's George R. Terry book award. The prize is awarded to the book that makes the most outstanding contribution to management knowledge.

Publications
His work has been published in top social science journals such as Administrative Science Quarterly, Academy of Management Journal, Academy of Management Review, Strategic Management Journal, and Organization Studies. A selection:  
 1997. (with Paul M. Hirsch) Ending the Family Quarrel: Towards a Reconciliation of “Old” and “New” Institutionalism. American Behavioral Scientist, 40: 406-418.
 2001.  Institutional Sources of Practice Variation: Staffing College and University Recycling Programs.  Administrative Science Quarterly, 46: 29-56.  Won J.D. Thompson Best Paper Award, Organizations, Occupations and Work section, American Sociological Association.  Reprinted in Amy Wharton (Ed.) The Sociology of Organizations: An Anthology of Contemporary Theory and Research, Roxbury, 2007. 
 2001. (with Mary Ann Glynn) Cultural Entrepreneurship: Stories, Legitimacy and the Acquisition of Resources.  Strategic Management Journal, 22: 545-564.
 2002. Institutional Transformation and Status Mobility: The Professionalization of the Field of Finance.  Academy of Management Journal, 45: 255-266.
 2004. (with Hayagreeva Rao).  Sources of Durability and Change in Market Classifications: A Study of the Reconstitution of Product Categories in the American Mutual Fund Industry, 1944-1985.  Social Forces, 82: 969-999.
 2007.  A Tale of Two Cities: Competing Logics and Practice Variation in the Professionalizing of Mutual Funds.  Academy of Management Journal, 50: 289-307.
 2007. (with Ellen T. Crumley).  New Practice Creation: An Institutional Approach to Innovation.  Organization Studies, 28: 993-1012.
 2007 (with Chris Marquis).  Vive la Résistance: Competing Logics in the Consolidation of Community Banking.  Academy of Management Journal, 50: 799-820.
 2008.  Institutional Rationality and Practice Variation: New Directions in the Institutional Analysis of Practice. Accounting, Organizations and Society, 33: 349-361
 2009. (with Klaus Weber and Jerry Davis).  Policy as Myth and Ceremony? The Spread of Stock Exchanges, 1980-2005.  Academy of Management Journal, 52: 1319-1347.
 2010. (with Mayer N. Zald). The Wizards of OZ: Towards an Institutional Approach to Elites, Expertise and Command Posts.  Organization Studies, 31: 963-996.
 2011. (with Tyler Wry Tyler and Mary Ann Glynn).  Legitimizing Nascent Collective Identities: Coordinating Cultural Entrepreneurship.  Organization Science, 22: 449-463.

References

External links
  Homepage at ualberta.ca
 National Research Council Canada National Institute for Nanotechnology

1966 births
Living people
American business theorists
Cornell University faculty
Northwestern University alumni